Havelock Academy is a secondary school and sixth form with Academy status, based in Grimsby, North East Lincolnshire, England.

Admissions
It is situated north of the A46, near the junction with the A1031, on the opposite of the road from the former Matthew Humberstone School (also now an Academy).

History
The school is named after Havelok the Dane.

The Havelock School
It had around 900 boys and girls in the 1960s, administered by the County Borough of Grimsby Education Committee. It had grammar, technical, commercial and modern streams.

Comprehensive
It became a comprehensive in 1968 with 1300 boys and girls. From 1974-96 it was administered by Humberside Education Committee. In 1987, a 13-year-old boy drowned on a school trip to Scarborough.

Prior to opening in September 2007, the Academy was previously known as Havelock School.

Academy
It became an Academy in 2007, sponsored by the David Ross Education Trust. The academy was officially opened by The Duchess of Cambridge on 5 March 2013, who was carrying out engagements in Grimsby on the day.

Academic results
As a comprehensive, the school came in the bottom thirty schools in England at GCSE. In 2000, it came in the bottom forty. Around 6% gained 5 good GCSE grades.

In 2009, as an Academy, around 40% gain five good GCSEs - the fourth best in Grimsby.

Notable former pupils

The Havelock School
 Sir Patrick Cormack, Conservative MP from 1970-4 for Cannock, from 1974-83 for South West Staffordshire and from 1983-2010 for South Staffordshire
 Prof David Drewry, Vice-Chancellor from 1999-2009 of the University of Hull
 Raymond Plant, Baron Plant of Highfield, Master from 1994-2000 of St Catherine's College, Oxford
 Martin Vickers, MP for Cleethorpes, 2010–present. Attended Havelock 1962-67.

References

External links
 Havelock Academy
 EduBase

News items
 29 year old Drama teacher jailed for six years in August 2010

Schools in Grimsby
Academies in the Borough of North East Lincolnshire
Secondary schools in the Borough of North East Lincolnshire